Wildburg may refer to the follow castles in Germany:
 Wildburg (Sargenroth), a ruined castle near Sargenroth in the Hunsrück mountains of Germany
 Wildburg (Treis-Karden), a castle in the municipality of Treis-Karden on the River Moselle

See also
 Waldberg (disambiguation)
 Waldburg (disambiguation)
 Wildberg (disambiguation)
 Wildenburg (disambiguation)